The Medal of Honor was created during the American Civil War and is the highest military decoration presented by the United States government to a member of its armed forces. The recipients must have distinguished themselves at the risk of their own life above and beyond the call of duty in action against an enemy of the United States.

Since the April 1975 end of American presence in Vietnam, the United States military has been involved in a number of conflicts and peacekeeping activities, including actions in the invasion of Grenada, Lebanese Civil War, invasion of Panama, the Yugoslav Wars, the Somali Civil War and elsewhere. Following the September 11 attacks, the United States entered into a War on Terror against militant Islamists, the War in Afghanistan and the Iraq War.

The Medal of Honor has been awarded to 30 U.S. servicemen for actions since Vietnam, seventeen to living recipients.

The first post-Vietnam Medal of Honor recipients were two Delta Force snipers, MSG Gary Gordon and SFC Randy Shughart, who volunteered to defend a downed helicopter pilot in the 1993 Battle of Mogadishu in Somalia; the medals were awarded posthumously.

Recipients

Somali Civil War
The Battle of Mogadishu or for Somalis Ma-alinti Rangers ("The Day of the Rangers") was a battle that was part of Operation Gothic Serpent that was fought on October 3 and 4, 1993, in Mogadishu, Somalia, by forces of the United States supported by UNOSOM II against Somali militia fighters loyal to warlord Mohamed Farrah Aidid. The battle is also referred to as the First Battle of Mogadishu to distinguish it from the Second Battle of Mogadishu in 2006. The Medals were awarded to two Delta Force operators, both snipers, who volunteered to attempt to save the pilot of one of the downed UH-60 Black Hawk helicopters, despite facing hundreds, possibly thousands of rebels around the crash site.

War in Afghanistan
The War in Afghanistan, which began on October 7, 2001, was launched by the United States, the United Kingdom, and NATO allies in response to the September 11, 2001 attacks. It was the beginning of the War on Terrorism. The stated purpose of the invasion was to capture Osama bin Laden, destroy al-Qaeda, and remove the Taliban regime which had provided support and safe harbor to al-Qaeda.

Since 2001, 20 U.S. servicemen have received the Medal of Honor for actions in Afghanistan, five of them posthumously.

Iraq War
The Iraq War, also known as the Second Gulf War, Operation Iraqi Freedom (US), Operation TELIC (UK) or the occupation of Iraq, was a conflict which began on March 20, 2003 with the United States-led invasion of Iraq by a multinational coalition composed of U.S. and British troops supported by smaller contingents from Australia, Poland, and other nations. Six service members have posthumously received the Medal of Honor for actions in Iraq: four from the Army, one from the Marine Corps and one from the Navy. Army Staff Sergeant David Bellavia is currently the only living recipient of the Medal of Honor for his service during the Iraq war.

Operation Inherent Resolve
One soldier received the Medal of Honor during the fight against ISIL.

References

Lists of Medal of Honor recipients